The Roman Catholic Diocese of Kenema is a diocese Catholic Church in the Ecclesiastical province of Freetown in Sierra Leone. The region that the Diocese comprises are the border from Bo District to the west, the Republic of Liberia in the southeast, Tonkolili District and Kono District in the north, Guinea in the east.

It was established on 11 November 1970, with its territory being split off from the diocese of Freetown and Bo. The cathedral parish for the diocese is the St. Paul's Cathedral in Kenema.

Bishops

Ordinaries
 Bishops of Kenema (Roman rite)
 Bishop Joseph Henry Ganda (1970-11-11 – 1980-09-04), appointed Archbishop of Freetown and Bo
 Bishop John C. O'Riordan, C.S.Sp., COR (1984-06-04 – 2002-04-26)
 Bishop Patrick Daniel Koroma (2002-04-26 - 2018-12-14)
 Bishop Henry Aruna (2019.01.26 -)

Auxiliary Bishop
Henry Aruna (2015-2019), appointed Bishop here

Other priest of this diocese who became bishop
Edward Tamba Charles, appointed Archbishop of Freetown and Bo in 2008

See also
Roman Catholicism in Sierra Leone
Roman Catholic Archdiocese of Freetown

Sources
 GCatholic.org
 Catholic Hierarchy

 
Catholic Church in Sierra Leone
Roman Catholic dioceses in Sierra Leone
Christian organizations established in 1970
Roman Catholic dioceses and prelatures established in the 20th century
1970 establishments in Sierra Leone